Stanislav Marselyevich Lebamba (born 21 April 1988) is a Russian former a professional football player.

Club career
He played 8 seasons in the Russian Football National League for FC KAMAZ Naberezhnye Chelny, FC Yenisey Krasnoyarsk and FC Khimik Dzerzhinsk.

Personal life
His father is from DR Congo and his mother is Russian.

References

External links
 Career summary by sportbox.ru  
 
 

1988 births
Living people
Sportspeople from Oryol
Russian people of Democratic Republic of the Congo descent
Russian footballers
Association football midfielders
FC KAMAZ Naberezhnye Chelny players
FC Mordovia Saransk players
FC Yenisey Krasnoyarsk players
FC Saturn Ramenskoye players
FK Liepāja players
BFC Daugavpils players
Latvian Higher League players
Russian expatriate footballers
Expatriate footballers in Latvia
FC Khimik Dzerzhinsk players